The Fortress of Humaitá (1854–68), known metaphorically as the Gibraltar of South America, was a Paraguayan military installation near the mouth of the River Paraguay.  A strategic site without equal in the region, "a fortress the likes of which had never been seen in South America", it was "the key to Paraguay and the upper rivers".  It played a crucial role in the deadliest conflict in the continent's history – the Paraguayan War – of which it was the principal theatre of operations.
 

The site was a sharp horseshoe bend in the river; practically all vessels wishing to enter the Republic of Paraguay – and indeed to steam onwards to the Brazilian province of Mato Grosso – were forced to navigate it.  The bend was commanded by a  line of artillery batteries, at the end of which was a chain boom which, when raised, detained the shipping under the guns. The navigable channel was only 200 yards wide and ran in easy reach of the artillery.  The fortress was protected from attack on its landward side by impenetrable swamp or, where this was lacking, defensive earthworks which, at their greatest extension, comprised a system of trenches stretching for 8 lineal miles (13 km), had a garrison of 18,000 men and deployed 120 cannon. At its zenith Humaitá was reputed to be impassable to enemy shipping.

The widespread perception which it created in its heyday – that Paraguay was a country difficult to invade – may have induced its Marshal-President Francisco Solano López to take unnecessary risks in foreign policy and, in particular, to seize government vessels and provinces of the much more populous Brazil and Argentina and to send armies to invade them and Uruguay.  They united against him in the Treaty of the Triple Alliance.  The war led to his country's utter defeat and ruin and the casualties were immense.

A declared purpose of the Treaty of the Triple Alliance was the demolition of the Humaitá fortifications and that none others of that sort should be built again. However the fortress, though not by then invulnerable to the latest armour-plated warships, was a serious obstacle to the Allies’ plans to proceed upriver to the Paraguayan capital Asunción and to recapture the Brazilian territory of Mato Grosso: it delayed them for two and a half years. It was taken in the Siege of Humaitá (1868), then razed pursuant to the Treaty.

For present-day Paraguayans Humaitá is a symbol of national pride, standing for their country's unyielding will to resist.

Motives for its construction

Key to Paraguay
Paraguay is a landlocked country and for much of its history it was difficult of access, except by sailing from the Atlantic up the River Paraná and hence the River Paraguay (see map) as the early Spanish explorers had done. There were other means of ingress, but they would have required an invading force to be resupplied through difficult and hostile country. So the command of the river was key to the security of Paraguay, who feared and distrusted its two much larger neighbours Brazil and Argentina.

Anxiety about the Brazilian Empire
In a long history of conflicts between the empires of Portugal and Spain in America,  the Portuguese made numerous incursions – some of them permanent – into Spanish-claimed territory. Slave raids by Bandeirantes (frontiersmen from what is now Brazil) into the Jesuit Reductions of Paraguay carried off many Guaraní inhabitants, who feared and despised the Brazilians. The boundaries between the two empires were not resolved and the conflicts continued after independence, when Portuguese America became the Empire of Brazil. Brazil had no practical access to its own territory of Mato Grosso except by sailing from the Atlantic Ocean up the River Paraguay (see map); fear that Paraguay might interfere with the navigation was a source of conflict.  Where Paraguay ended, and where the Brazilian Mato Grosso began, was a matter of opinion.

Anxiety about Buenos Aires
The Spanish Viceroyalty of the River Plate occupied an enormous territory roughly coterminous with the modern-day territories of Bolivia, central and northern Argentina, Paraguay and Uruguay. Although it did not exist for very long (1776–1810) the Spanish Viceroy had his seat in the city of Buenos Aires. Upon becoming independent from Spain the city claimed and thought itself rightly to be the capital of an identical territory it called the United Provinces of South America.  Other provinces – especially Bolivia, Uruguay and Paraguay – begged to differ and the Viceroyalty broke up in acrimony and warfare. In particular, Buenos Aires did not recognise the right of Paraguay to act independently and in 1811 sent an army under General Manuel Belgrano to prevent it, without success. The Buenos Aires governor Juan Manuel Rosas, "who viewed Paraguay as an errant province" during his dictatorship (1835–52) tried to bring Paraguay to heel by closing the River Paraná to commercial traffic (see Battle of Vuelta de Obligado).  Buenos Aires province fell out with the other provinces of the Argentine Confederation and declared itself the independent State of Buenos Aires; it did not recognise Paraguay's independence even after the others had.  It was not until quite late in the nineteenth century (1859) that a re-united Argentina formally recognised an independent Paraguay. Even so, the boundaries between Argentina and Paraguay were in dispute, notably the Chaco and Misiones territories.

Defensive outlook of Paraguay
Upon its independence in 1811 Paraguay tried to keep out of the anarchy of adjoining Hispanic America.  Its formidable dictator José Gaspar Rodríguez de Francia (1820–1840) imposed a strict policy of isolation.  During his reign few were allowed to enter Paraguay, or to leave it. Professor Williams' assessment: "In an attempt to coerce Paraguay economically and bring it to its knees, Buenos Aires only stiffened Paraguayan nationalism and produced a voluntary, xenophobic isolation of the breakaway province".

After Francia's death he was succeeded by Carlos Antonio López, (called ‘López I’ by some authors, a convenient if inaccurate designation), the father of Francisco Solano López (‘López II’). López I did open up Paraguay to foreign trade and technology, but the steamship made his country vulnerable to invasion and he understandably feared the machinations of his powerful neighbours.

During his presidency there were conflicts, not only with Brazil and Buenos Aires, but also the United States: the  affair of  1855 in which the  fired upon an American warship, which led to a US naval expedition against Paraguay in 1858.  Although Carlos López was astute enough to know when to back down, he resolved to make Paraguay immune to foreign attack in future.

Immediate cause of its construction

In 1777, in colonial times, a modest guardia (fortlet or lookout post) was established at Humaitá, a place about 15 miles above the mouth of the River Paraguay.  However, a more formidable version was built in stages on the orders of López I.  He started the work hurriedly in 1854 during conflict with Brazil over boundaries and navigation, when Paraguay was threatened by a Brazilian flotilla;  fortunately for López, the Brazilians were delayed by the low state of the river.  The Paraguayan author and diplomat Gregorio Benítes − who was in the Paraguayan army at the time − gives a different explanation.  López I, hearing the Brazilian squadron was on its way, immediately transferred 6,000 troops from Paso de Patria to Humaitá; working night and day, in 15 days they fortified that place, including furnaces for making red hot cannonballs.  The Brazilian squadron desisted because of the strength of the fortifications; the low state of the water is mentioned only incidentally.  Thomas Jefferson Page USN wrote an independent account that tends to confirm Benites' version.

Initial works
To a design by the Hungarian colonel of engineers , he hastily fortified the river's left bank with a few batteries, which were continually but slowly augmented, and a trench was dug on the land side enclosing the rear of them.  He felled the virgin forest, leaving only a few scattered trees, grubbed up the roots, and laid out the first batteries, to whose completion some two years were devoted. By January 1859 the installation appeared formidable.  As described by an eyewitness aboard , part of the Paraguay expedition sent by President Buchanan to demand reparations for wrongs alleged to have been done to the United States

Sixteen ominous apertures pointed their gloom, and whatever else they may contain, upon us; and, like the eyes of the figure in the picture, seemed to follow the vessel's motion ... These apertures are those of the casemate battery, constructed of brick, but very deep, and defended by the very formidable battery of sixteen eight inch guns. Numerous other batteries were noticed.  Fulton, having left the rest of her squadron behind, was allowed to proceed upriver.

The works, which were continually extended, were supervised by British engineers, of whom there were a considerable number on contract to the government of Paraguay.

Description of the finished fortress

Location
The fortress of Humaitá was situated on a level cliff about 30 feet (10 metres) above the river, on a sharp horseshoe bend. The bend, called the ‘’’Vuelta de Humaitá’’’ was an ideal strategic pinch point.

An unpleasant surprise for an invading flotilla was that, owing to the peculiar conformation of the river bed, there were "treacherous backwaters which often neutralize the action of the rudder, in direct proportion to the length of vessels".

First impression
The explorer Captain Sir Richard Burton, who visited the scene during the war – when the Brazilians were still dismantling the fortifications – described it thus:
The sweep is more than usually concave, to the benefit of gunnery and the detriment of shipping.  Nothing more dangerous than this great bend, where vessels were almost sure to get confused under fire, as happened at Port Hudson to the fleet commanded by Admiral D. G. Farragut.  The level bank, twenty to thirty feet above the river, and dipping in places, is bounded by swamps up-stream and down-stream.  Earthworks, consisting of trenches, curtains and redans, disposed at intervals where wanted, and suggesting the lines of Torres Vedras, rest both their extremities upon the river, whose shape here is that of the letter U, and extend in gibbous shape inland to the south.  The outline measures nearly eight miles and a half, and encloses meadow land to the extent of 8,000,000 square yards – a glorious battlefield.

The channel
The 200-yard wide navigable channel ran close to the east bank i.e. the river batteries.

River batteries

An invading force, if steaming around the bend upriver, would have to pass eight fixed batteries, all capable of concentrating fire on the reentrant angle.  Furthermore shipping was within range of the heavy guns well before arriving at the bend, and well after it.

The batteries are variously named in the sources, and the number of guns may not have been constant.

Preliminary batteries
First the invading force had to pass the Humaitá redoubt, armed with a single 8 inch (20 cm calibre) gun.

It must then pass the Itapirú (seven guns); the Pesada [heavy] (five guns), all partly revetted with brick; the Octava or Madame Lynch (three guns en barbette); the  Coimbra (eight guns); and the Tacuarí (three guns).

The Batería Londres
Next, the invading flotilla must pass the Batería Londres (so called because most of the técnicos in Paraguay were recruited by the Limehouse, London, firm of J. & A. Blyth). It was supposed to be rendered bomb-proof by layers of earth heaped upon brick arches, and there were embrasures for 16 guns. "Of these ports" said Burton "eight were walled up and converted into workshops, because the artillerymen were in hourly dread of their caving in and crumbling down."

The Batería Cadenas
As a climax the invading force would come alongside the Bateria Cadenas (Chain battery, for it protected the chain boom), backed by the Artillery Barracks.  According to a survey by the Brazilian engineering corps this battery had 18 guns.

The chain boom
The boom across the river, intended to detain shipping under the guns, is variously described in the sources.  Richard Burton and Commander Kennedy RN said it comprised 7 chains twisted together, of which (wrote Burton) the largest had a 1.75  inch diameter link. It was made fast to a windlass supported by a house about 100 yards from the bank. Nearer the battery stood a still larger capstan. Other  sources, notably George Thompson (de facto chief engineer of Paraguayan army) wrote that there were three chains side-by-side, of which the heaviest had 7.5 inch links, sustained by barges and canoes.

The latter were partly sustained by large floating iron boxes.

Approach

Before even arriving at the Vuelta de Humaitá an invading squadron would first have to navigate the River Paraguay from its mouth, and run the gauntlet of such batteries as the Paraguayans were able to deploy on its left bank, particularly at Curuzú and Curupayty.  Whether unarmoured warships could have done so without being sunk was never ascertained; during the War the unarmoured wooden vessels of the Imperial Brazilian Navy did not attempt it.

Although heavily iron-plated ships ought not be sunk by these river batteries, their very weight and size made them difficult, and at times impossible, to navigate in the shallow waters of the River Paraguay.  As Commander Kennedy of the Royal Navy observed:

The river Paraguay presents no important obstacles to navigation, the principal point to observe being the [seasonal] rise of the water; this varies sometimes as much as three fathoms [5 1/2 metres] ...  The danger attendant on grounding in the Paraguay is ... [that it] has a sharp rocky bottom ...  The entrance to the Paraguay at Tres Bocas is  500 yards wide, and at medium river there is a depth of twelve feet of water. The iron-clads of the Brazilian fleet, many of which drew twelve and thirteen feet of water, were entirely dependent on these periodical rises, both for forward movements, and also for retreat, if it should have been necessary. Their guns and ammunition were not shipped until they arrived at Corrientes; for the Paraná is equally shallow in various parts...

It is difficult to conceive a more formidable obstacle to an advancing squadron than this small portion of the river between Tres Bocas and Humaitá. The water is shallow, and most uncertain in its depth; the turnings in the channel are sharp and frequent, and every available point was bristling with guns of heavy calibre ...

'Torpedoes'

For an invading force of ironclads the most dangerous aspect of Humaitá was not the artillery batteries but the 'torpedoes' that could be released in the confined, shallow and uncharted stream of the River Paraguay.

These torpedoes were improvised contact mines.  The first was devised by "a Yankee, Mr. Krüger".  They consisted of a zinc cylinder containing a charge of gunpowder. The largest ever made used a charge of 1,500 lbs (680 kilos) and the explosion shook the ground at the town of Corrientes, Argentina twenty miles off.  The fuses were designed and made by George Frederick Masterman, chief apothecary to the Paraguayan Army: they were glass capsules of sulphuric acid which, when broken by striking a heavy object, ignited a potassium chlorate/sugar mixture.

Although most of these devices failed to go off, except prematurely, one did sink the 1,000 ton Brazilian ironclad Rio de Janeiro killing 155 men, so they had to be taken seriously.  Since a "torpedo" (simulated or real) was released almost every night, the Brazilian navy had to have patrol boats out rowing in three shifts  which tried to spot the floating torpedoes; if they did, they attempted to hook their floats with grappling irons on long lines.  Wrote Commander Kennedy RN, "It was a service of great danger".

Apart from the more common floating type, which could be seen and removed, the Paraguayans deployed "torpedoes" moored to the river bed, which could not. These were a potent psychological barrier.

Deploying the torpedoes was not without its dangers either.  After Kruger's death – he was blown up by one of his torpedoes – the work was taken over by a Paraguayan called Ramos who had served an apprenticeship in England.  He met the same fate, and the work was given to a Polish refugee named Michkoffsky.  Michkoffsky used to take the torpedoes down the river in a canoe paddled by four boys.  One day he was distracted and the boys absconded to the Allies with the torpedo: he was arrested, reduced to the ranks and sent to the front, where he was soon killed.  An anonymous, if brave, Paraguayan diver tried to attach a torpedo to the Brazilian ironclad Brasil by hand: this was deduced when he was found entangled in her rudder-chains, drowned.

The Paraguayans deliberately moored empty  demijohns in the river to make the Brazilian navy suppose they marked the situations of torpedoes.  It made them noticeably reluctant to navigate its waters.

Landward defences; the Quadrilateral

  
The Paraguayans had also taken precautions against Humaitá being seized from the landward side. These trenches mounted batteries where appropriate. The trenches and natural barriers are shown in the map reproduced in this section of this Article, which was drawn to scale by Lt. Colonel George Thompson of the Paraguayan army; he personally made a detailed trigonometric survey of the ground. The map is corroborated by Burton's detailed verbal description based on his own inspection on horseback and on figures supplied to him by Lt. Colonel Chodasiewicz of the Argentine Army.

Burton reported that the layout required a garrison of at least 10,000 men;  at the time of the Siege of Humaitá the Allied Commander-in-chief estimated that it had 18,000 and possibly 20,000 men and 120 cannon not including the river batteries.

Flood defences
The colonel in charge of the Paraguayan military engineering  George Thompson  arranged for part of the Quadrilateral to be protected by flood defences.  The Quadrilateral had a weak spot or potential invasion point at Paso Gómez (the Spanish word "paso" denotes a pass), denoted  on the map in this Section.  But by damming the Estero Bellaco N. at  where it  entered the zone denoted "Thick Jungle" he raised the water level  at Paso Gómez by more than 6 feet (2 metres).  Further, he provided a sluice-gate.  "Should the enemy get [in] and prepare for a rush ... the gate would be opened, and a terrible flood of water would carry them all before it into the 'carrizal'."

Electrical telegraphy
In the final stages of the fortifications electrical telegraph lines were laid out from Humaitá and the points in the Quadrilateral to López's headquarters at Pasó Pucú; and he could instantly be informed—in Morse code—of an enemy attack on any point.  George Thompson recorded that the Guaraní became adept telegraphists.  "The telegraphs were kept working all day, the commander of a division being obliged to report every little thing to López, who was receiving these despatches all day long".

Headquarters

López II established his headquarters at Paso Pucú, one of the corners of the Quadrilateral (see map in this Section).   Amongst orange groves stood the dwellings of López, his mistress Eliza Lynch, and military officers who enjoyed his confidence e.g. Generals Barrios, Resquín, and Bruges; also Bishop Palacios,  Lt Colonel George Thompson the chief engineer and Dr Stewart the surgeon-general. The houses were simple ranchos (austere dwellings) with thatched roofs.  A quadrangle of large traverses or earthworks protected from Allied artillery fire his house, that of Mrs Lynch, and those of his servants.  These earthworks were made of sods and the largest was said to contain 422,080 pieces.  At the centre of the quadrangle was a mangrullo or watchtower. According to Burton the mangrullo's ladders were surrounded by hides and matting, "an unusual precaution intended to conceal petticoated ankles", for it was used by Mrs Lynch; and indeed a contemporaneous drawing by the Brazilian engineering corps does show, unusually for Paraguay, a mangrullo with a covered ascent.

A large military hospital was established halfway between Humaitá and Paso Pucú and another one for field officers at Paso Pucú itself.  At Paso Pucú there were two settlements for female camp-followers; they assisted in the hospitals and washed the soldiers' clothes.  They were allowed no rations, and lived on what beef the soldiers gave them.  There was a cemetery, and a prisoner-of war compound.

Newspapers
At headquarters were published the military newspapers Cabichuí (Spanish) and Cacique Lambaré (mainly in Guaraní).  These featured crude but effective propaganda woodcuts, often of a racially offensive nature.  Paper was in short supply but an ersatz version was improvised from caraguatá (wild pineapple).

Unmapped terrain

While the Paraguayans were familiar with the ground, maps of the territory were, for the Allies, non-existent.  The area lay in the province of Ñeembucú, which is flat, low-lying and obscured by swamp or carrizal.  For example, when they established their main camp at Tuyutí in southern Paraguay the Allies did not realise they were placing it within earshot of the southwestern line of the Quadrilateral: the Sauce trench. They did not even know Humaitá was protected by the Quadrilateral: In his 5-volume work on the Paraguayan war the Brazilian historian Tasso Fragoso insists that a Brazilian high command letter of April 1867 does not leave the slightest doubt that the allies were completely ignorant not only of the topography of the terrain [to the south-east of the fortress], but that all of it was protected by lines of [Paraguayan] entrenchments.

In order to gradually map the area the Allies were obliged to resort to mangrullos (improvised watch towers) or (a first in South American warfare) captive observation balloons, but the Paraguayans obscured the terrain by lighting fires of damp grass.

The Chaco side
On the opposite bank of the River Paraguay begins the area known as the Gran Chaco, with a different, hot, semi-arid climate.  This part of the Chaco, now part of Argentina, but in dispute in those days, was inhabited by none except the fierce Toba nomads.  The Chaco bank of the River Paraguay is low, and liable to flooding.  In front of Humaitá the land was quite impracticable as far as Timbó which, when the river was high, was completely under water.  (Later, military roads were made through there at vast effort.)

Later in the war, when the Allies started a flanking movement to the southeast of Humaitá, López sent and had the Chaco explored, and gave orders to build a road through the Chaco from Timbó (the nearest place on the coast opposite Humaitá where a landing could be effected).
The road through the Chaco was tolerably straight, and was fifty-four miles long.  It did not follow the course of the River Paraguay, but went inland.  The great part of the road went through deep mud, and five deep streams had to be crossed, apart from the River Bermejo.  

Once he appreciated his position was hopeless, López used this road to escape from Humaitá with the bulk of his troops and artillery.  They were ferried from Humaitá to Timbó by two Paraguayan paddle steamers, and on canoes.

Strategic significance and perception
At least before the introduction of iron-plated warships, Humaitá had the reputation of being impregnable, and it became famous as the "Sebastopol of South America".   During the war the European press compared it to the Richmond and Vicksburg of the American Civil War.  It was also famed in Europe and the United States as the Gibraltar of South America.

Michael Mulhall, editor of the Buenos Ayres Standard, passed the site in 1863 and reported it to the world in these terms:

When López I built Humaitá all warships were made of wood, and steamships were mostly paddle-driven.

While it might have been possible for an army to invade Paraguay without going past Humaitá, any such attempt would have been problematical.  The only practicable alternative route − used by General Belgrano when he unsuccessfully invaded Paraguay in 1811 − led through the Upper Paraná and hence north through difficult country towards Villa Rica.  This alternative route was considered by the Allies in 1865, but rejected as too difficult.

A modern appreciation by Professor Whigham:
  Whigham said it was "a fortress the likes of which had never been seen in South America".

For Professor Francisco Doratioto, Humaitá (and environs) was the principal theatre of operations of the Paraguayan war.

Weaknesses

In fact, Humaitá was not invulnerable, at any rate after a sufficient supply of river-navigating ironclad warships became available in South America.  Indeed Burton, having inspected the captured site, thought that its potency had been greatly exaggerated – to the point that it was a bluff.  The commander of the Portuguese war vessel Zarco, also there at the time, wondered how Humaitá could have humbled a powerful navy for so long.

Defective weaponry

Although Paraguay could and did manufacture large artillery guns, there was nevertheless a shortage—partly because guns had to be taken to reinforce the landward artillery –  and not all of the guns at Humaitá were of acceptable standard. When Burton inspected them (August 1868) he noted that many had been thrown into deep water but the remainder were poor:

However, Burton may well have been underestimating the Paraguayan artillery at its zenith: according to both Thompson and Jourdan, some guns had already been evacuated to the Chaco side by the Paraguayans when abandoning the fortress.  The gunboat HMS Dotterel, while anchored at Humaitá for three hours in June 1865, from the river counted 116 guns, a number far greater than was recorded by Burton or Jourdan when inspecting the captured fortress.

Defective fortifications
According to Burton  the system of fortification lacked the latest developments, mostly using the obsolete en barbette system which failed to protect the defending artillerymen.  The consequence:

Other observers formed similar impressions.  Thompson wrote that it should have been easy for the Brazilian flotilla firing grape and canister to "sweep the Paraguayans away from their guns"".  The British gunboat HMS Doterel, which had passed the site in 1865 (long before it was damaged in the war) likewise thought the artillerymen were far too exposed,  Wrote a British diplomat aboard Doterel:
We counted 116 pieces of cannon, heavy and light, but all of these pieces, with the exception of one heavy battery of 16 guns [the Londres], are en barbette, and the crews of the guns are utterly unprotected from shell, canister, or rifle bullets.  As regards the heavy 16-gun casemated battery, the embrasures appear to be wrongly constructed, according to modern ideas on such subjects, the large aperture of the embrasure facing the enemy, and becoming an excellent target for riflemen, almost all of whose bullets must tell on the crew of the gun within.

Obsolescence

López I fortified Humaitá in the era of the wooden paddle-steamer warship. Gloire, the first ironclad warship was not launched until 1859 and that was in France, intended for a blue-water navy; and no battles between European ironclads had actually happened.

However, the evolution of the navies in the American Civil War (1861–65) had fulfilled a demand for heavily armoured vessels that could navigate in river waters.  The Battle of Hampton Roads, in which iron-armoured Union and Confederate warships were unable to sink each other, dramatically demonstrated their resistance to heavy artillery.  News of this naval engagement arrived in the River Plate on 14 May 1862 and was reported in the Buenos Aires Standard in these terms:

The two steel vessels commenced a cannonade a mile apart, without doing any damage on either side.  In less than an hour and a half they were alongside, and then raged so terrible an encounter that both vessels were enveloped in smoke.  Two balls from the Monitor entered her adversary's cuirass; as soon as the wind cleared away the smoke the Monitor was seen running round Merrimac, looking for a vulnerable point, the vessels being about 35 yards apart ...

The Merrimac drove her spur against the Monitor, which received the awful shock motionless and unhurt.  Now they were so close that the guns fired into each others' mouths: at length the Confederate got a wound which made her hail the others to tow her into Norfolk.  After so terrible a conflict for several hours against heavy artillery, the Monitor showed only a few dinges and scratches.  The Merrimac's spur scarcely marked her side.

The superiority so established of steel-clad vessels has caused an immense sensation in America ...

The American sea-fight caused great excitement in England, since it was feared that the new invention would rob that country of naval supremacy.  Wooden men of war were declared, in the House of Commons, to be useless, and the Admiralty had stopped all the fortifications and arsenals, to devote all attention to the construction of a steel fleet 35 in number.

Apart from the more conventional ironclads, which the Brazilian navy could order from Britain or France, as noted the Americans had invented the monitor, an armoured, shallow draft, turreted vessel that presented little superstructure to enemy fire; monitors could be and were built in Brazil.  Thus by the time López II fired the first shots against Brazil (December 1864) the Humaitá defences were obsolescent to the latest naval weaponry that could be manufactured or purchased.  Brazil was an enormous country and after the war broke out it could have (and soon did have) at least 10 ironclads.

That said, an ironclad naval force, by itself, was unlikely to pose a strategic threat to the Paraguayan nation.  For assuming the latest ironclads could get past Humaitá – which they eventually did – it did not follow that unarmoured troopships could do so.  Without the logistical support of an invading army, ironclads could not have operated far ahead of their lines of supply, except temporarily.

Lack of tautness in the chain boom

Even heavily armoured vessels might have been impeded by the chain boom, but it turned out to have an Achilles' heel: it could not be drawn tight enough without intermediate floating supports – and these might be sunk by naval gunfire.

Burton's description of the chain boom was:
The chain, which consisted of seven twisted together, passed diagonally through a kind of brick tunnel.  On this side [of the River Paraguay] it was made fast to a windlass supported by a house about 100 yards from the bank.  Nearer the battery stood a still larger capstan: the latter, however, wanted force to haul tight the chain.  This was so provided an enemy destroyed the chain's intermediate floating supports; for as explained by Thompson, the chains weresupported on a number of canoes, and on three pontoons.  The [Brazilian] ironclads fired for three months at these pontoons and canoes, sinking all of them, when, of course, the chain went to the bottom, as the river there is about 700 yards wide, and the chain could not be drawn tight without intermediate supports.  The chain was thus buried some two feet under the mud of the river, offering no obstacle whatever to the navigation.

Supplying the garrison
Because the marshlands were not ideal for the raising of cattle or the cultivation of manioc or maize, and because the Quadrilateral required a large garrison, food for Humaitá needed to be brought in from elsewhere.  However, it was a very difficult position to supply.

Cut off by swamps, there was no easy overland communication with the nearest food-producing regions.  There was a coastal road, but it was poor, unfitted for oxcarts or cattle droves during the winter floods.  During the War there was a shortage of steam vessels; small river craft were difficult to land in winter.  "Paraguay never resolved these transportation difficulties during the siege of Humaitá, and the army suffered the consequences", observed Professor Cooney.

Even so, Humaitá withstood a siege of more than two years.

Unintended consequences

The Humaitá system was built to increase the security of Paraguay, but its strength, real or perceived, may have had the opposite effect in the end.

Provocation of Brazil
For Brazil, the fortifications posed a potential threat to its own security and caused it to make some preparations for war. As noted by Lt Colonel George Thompson of the Paraguayan army:

Inducing overconfidence

For Leslie Bethell, López overestimated Paraguay's military power, which induced him to behave recklessly.  According to Professor Bethell:

For John Hoyt Williams, Humaitá was instrumental in generating the risk-taking behaviour: And:

After the passage of Humaitá, the Buenos Ayres Standard wrote:
None who have ever seen the place have questioned its strength. Old President López had such implicit faith in its impregnability that he believed if even a Xerxes attacked Paraguay he could not get past Humaitá. The same implicit confidence in its strength was inculcated in the minds of the Paraguayan people.  Their watchword was 'Humaitá', and possibly to the exaggerated idea of its strength by the present López may be traced the grave political error which step by step led this unfortunate man from the cautious policy of his father to become the great champion of River Plate equilibrium.

Alternative view
A possible alternative view is that López was aware that developments in naval warfare were making Humaitá obsolescent and so decided to take the offensive before Paraguay lost the balance of advantage altogether. Paraguay's chief engineer, the talented William Keld Whytehead, cannot have failed to become aware of the advantages of ironclad vessels and it is on record that in 1863 he obtained a British patent for an iron-cladded vessel; in October 1857 he had presented a project to López to construct ironclads (though it came to nothing).  Indeed, López himself only eight months after the Battle of Hampton Roads was pressing the American ambassador in Asunción to procure a monitor for him; and Paraguay placed orders for several ironclads to be built in European or Brazilian yards before the War.  According to Graz, Paraguay's agents Blyths of Limehouse prepared a design for a 200 ft double-turreted monitor, and even a monitor to be built in Asunción — armoured, not with iron, but with the extremely hard local timber quebracho colorado.

Further support for this view is afforded by López's hesitation in seizing the Marques de Olinda.  According to Thompson:

As against that, none of the sources cited in the article establish why López declared war without waiting for his ironclads to be completed and delivered. According to Burton, "it was the general opinion" that with a single ironclad at their disposal the Paraguayans "would have cleared the river".  He went further:
The war, indeed, was altogether premature: had the cuirassed ships and Whitworths ordered by the Marshal-President begun the campaign, he might now have supplied the place of Mexico with a third great Latin empire.

Instead, at an early stage of the war Paraguay's wooden vessels, only one of which had been built as a warship, were defeated by a Brazilian wooden flotilla at the Battle of the Riachuelo and so the River Paraguay was blockaded by the Brazilian navy, and the armoured ships that he had ordered could neither be delivered nor paid for. Brazil negotiated with the shipbuilders to transfer and complete the work-in-progress and eventually used the same ironclads to defeat Humaitá.

Upshot
A traditional view is that after the death of the cautious López I, his son paid not enough attention to his father's dying words: to try to settle disputes with Brazil with the pen, not the sword.  He was induced by the Uruguayan government to intervene in the Uruguayan War, which he did on 13 November 1864 by firing across the bows of and seizing the Brazilian government ship the  Marques de Olinda as she was proceeding upriver on her monthly voyage to the Mato Grosso; he proceeded to seize the Mato Grosso itself. According to the American ambassador to Paraguay, Charles A. Washburn, López explained his seizure of the Brazilian ship by saying "with more candor than discretion" that only by a war could the attention and respect of the world be secured to Paraguay; that although Paraguay was a small power in comparison with Brazil, it had "advantages of position" that gave her an equality of strength; and that the Paraguayan troops would be already "fortified and intrenched" before the Brazilians could arrive in any considerable numbers.

Encouraged by the sluggish response of Brazil, infuriated by the mockery of the Buenos Aires press, and impatient at Argentina's refusal to permit him to invade a further Brazilian province through sovereign Argentine territory, on 13 April 1865, López fired upon and seized two small Argentine naval vessels moored in the port of Corrientes and proceeded to take the Argentine province of that name and to make Paraguayan paper currency compulsory on pain of death. The resulting War of the Triple Alliance was to destroy his country.

Treaty of the Triple Alliance
The Treaty of the Triple Alliance against Paraguay was signed 1 May 1865 and specifically stated that Humaitá must be destroyed and never rebuilt. Article 18 provided that the terms of the treaty should be kept secret until its "principal objective" had been attained; Consul Thomas Hutchinson thought that referred not to the deposition of López but to the demolition of Humaitá.  Numerous political objectives are expressly mentioned in the treaty but no other military ones.

On the same day, the Allied High Command agreed a strategic plan, the first point of which read:

The objective of the campaign operations − to which [all] military operations and [invasion] routes must be subordinated − should be the position of Humaitá.

And:-

Effectiveness in practice
Despite Burton's strictures the Fortress of Humaitá was a serious obstacle to the Allies’ plans to proceed upriver.  On it being announced in Buenos Aires that Paraguay had fired upon and seized the Argentine naval vessels, President Mitre told a furious crowd that:
In fact, the Allies did not occupy the Paraguayan capital until 5 January 1869, nearly four years after Mitre's speech.  The main reason was the Humaitá complex.

It may have been "only seven leagues by land" from Paso de Patria to Humaitá, but it was land that it was necessary to traverse.  After expelling the Paraguayans from Argentine soil the Allies landed in Paraguay and occupied Paso de Patria on 23 April 1866.  They did not capture Humaitá until 5 August 1868.  The Humaitá phase of the Paraguayan war is outside the scope of this Article.  However, B.C. MacDermot thus summarised the difficulties:

An additional cause of delay, according to Professor Williams, was the long pause after the debacle of the Battle of Curupayty when the Allies overestimated the strength both of the opposing army and of Humaitá: they allowed López almost a year to rebuild his forces, devastated at the Battle of Tuyutí.

Endgame

On 19 February 1868 when the river was unusually high six Brazilian ironclad vessels were ordered to dash past Humaitá during the hours of darkness, which they did with no great difficulty because by then the chain boom was anyway lying in the river bed.  The Paraguayans stopped resupplying Humaitá by river and it was starved out.  The fortress was finally captured in the Siege of Humaitá, an operation that culminated on 5 August 1868.  It was razed pursuant to the Treaty of the Triple Alliance.  It was the decisive year of the Paraguayan War.

In literature
The second volume of the Argentine novelist Manuel Gálvez's trilogy Escenas de la Guerra del Paraguay is set in the Fortress of Humaitá.

See also
Passage of Humaitá
Siege of Humaitá
Paraguayan War
Treaty of the Triple Alliance
Francisco Solano López

Notes

Sources

Constitution of Argentina (1994 revision, in Spanish), Wikisource , retrieved 29 April 2015.

 (In three volumes: I. Caminos de la muerte.  II.  Humaitá.  III.  Jornadas de agonía.)

 

 (In three volumes.)

 

 (Note: Not all bound copies of this important source book have a complete set of maps. A scanned version of a relatively good copy at the Boston Public Library was accessed at the Internet Archive  on 29 April 2015.  It lacks pages 71–74 but those are not about Humaitá.)

External links
 La Fortaleza de Humaitá en 3D (idealised digital reconstruction of the Fortress with moving images and patriotic music .  Moving images start at 1:46.)

Paraguayan War
19th-century fortifications
Forts in Paraguay
History of Ñeembucú Department